Daniel Held (November 13, 1961 – January 5, 2015) was a Canadian professional ice hockey centre who played the majority of his playing career in Germany. He also played two seasons with the Maine Mariners in the American Hockey League (AHL). He was selected by the Philadelphia Flyers in the 5th round (105th overall) of the 1980 NHL Entry Draft. He died after an illness, in January 2015.

Career statistics

References

External links

1961 births
2015 deaths
Augsburger Panther players
Billings Bighorns players
Canadian ice hockey centres
Eisbären Berlin players
Frankfurt Lions players
Iserlohn Roosters players
Maine Mariners players
Ice hockey people from Calgary
Philadelphia Flyers draft picks
Seattle Breakers players
German ice hockey players
Canadian expatriate ice hockey players in Germany